The Canton of Guéret-Sud-Est was a canton situated in the Creuse département and in the Limousin region of central France. It was disbanded following the French canton reorganisation which came into effect in March 2015. It had 7,305 inhabitants (2012).

Geography 
An area of farming and light industry in the arrondissement of Guéret, centred on the town of Guéret. The altitude varies from 310m (Sainte-Feyre) to 685m (Guéret) with an average altitude of 416m.

The canton comprised 4 communes:
Guéret (partly)
La Saunière
Sainte-Feyre
Saint-Laurent

See also 
 Arrondissements of the Creuse department
 Cantons of the Creuse department
 Communes of the Creuse department

References

Gueret-Sud-Est
2015 disestablishments in France
States and territories disestablished in 2015